Major-General Benjamin Burton  (10 March 1855 – 6 August 1921) was a British Army officer.

Military career
Burton was commissioned into the Royal Artillery on 9 March 1875. He saw action in South Africa during the Second Boer War for which he was appointed a Companion of the Order of the Bath. He went on to become Commander, Royal Artillery for 1st Division in September 1907 and General Officer Commanding the Northumbrian Division in the UK in March 1912. He handed over command of his division and retired just before the division was deployed to France in April 1915. He was appointed a Companion of the Order of St Michael and St George in recognition of his services in connection with the First World War on 24 January 1917.

References

1855 births
1921 deaths
British Army major generals
Military personnel from Somerset
British Army generals of World War I
Companions of the Order of the Bath
Companions of the Order of St Michael and St George
Royal Artillery officers
British Army personnel of the Second Boer War